The East Asia Institute is a non-profit independent, private think tank founded in 2002 with the mission of seeking to establish a regional community based on democracy and a market economy. The chairman is Young-Sun Ha, an honorary professor from Seoul National University, and the president is Yonsei University professor Yul Sohn. The organisation is based in Seoul, South Korea. East Asia Institute's work focuses on interdisciplinary research in the social science fields. It is a member of the Council of Councils. It has created an archival website of publications related to North Korea.

The Think Tanks and Civil Societies Program (TTCSP) at the University of Pennsylvania ranked the East Asia Institute 68th in its worldwide ranking of think tanks.

References 

Think tanks established in 2002
2002 establishments in South Korea
Political and economic think tanks based in South Korea